The Mexico national korfball team represents Mexico in korfball international competitions.

Tournament history

References

Korfball
National korfball teams
National team